Ilepcimide, also known as antiepilepserine, is an anticonvulsant. It is a piperidine derivative that was first synthesized by Chinese researchers as an analogue of piperine, the main pungent compound and phytochemical of black pepper (and of other plants in the family Piperaceae).

Ilepcimide has serotonergic activity.

See also
 Black pepper

References 

Alkene derivatives
Carboxamides
Benzodioxoles
1-Piperidinyl compounds